"Run Devil Run" is a song by South Korean girl group Girls' Generation. The original Korean version was released on March 17, 2010, as a single from Run Devil Run (2010), the reissue of their 2010 studio album Oh!. A Japanese version was released digitally on January 25, 2011, by Nayutawave Records, and was later released as a double A-side single with "Mr. Taxi" on April 23, 2011, as the third single from their Japanese self-titled debut studio album.

Background
"Run Devil Run" was written by Alex James, Busbee, and Kalle Engström. In 2008, American singer Kesha provided the vocals for the demo of the song which has been leaked online. The song was pitched to SM Entertainment for Girls' Generation. In 2011, Girls' Generation recorded a Japanese version of "Run Devil Run", which was released as a double A-side with "Mr. Taxi".

Composition
The song is an electro pop song, with horn synths in the background, and strong harmonies. It is a strong conical departure from the group's usual musical style until that point.  It has been noted to use the schaffel beat.

Charting
Its first number one on network television was on KBS's Music Bank, where it won over Kara's "Lupin" and 2AM's "Jalmot Haesseo" (English: "I Was Wrong"). Moreover, "Run Devil Run" was ranked at number one on the Gaon Singles Chart for two weeks.

Promotion 
On March 11, 2010, photos of the members were started being released online showcasing a dark concept, the so-called Black SoShi.

In the run of promotions for the song, an official iPhone application was released, available in free and paid versions. The free version has 30-second previews for all the songs on the album, a music video for "Run Devil Run" and a few photographs. The paid version has full tracks for all the songs on the album, music videos for "Run Devil Run", "Gee", "Oh!" and "Tell Me Your Wish (Genie)", and a photo gallery.

They concluded their song promotions by May 2, 2010, in SBS's Inkigayo.

In Japan, "Run Devil Run" was first performed on Music Station on January 28, 2011.

Music videos
The music video for "Run Devil Run" was released on March 18. They also released a story version on March 31, 2010.

Original video
The original video contains two settings: a white room and a black room. Throughout the video, there are scenes of the girls dancing in these rooms, and there are individual close-ups of their own unique Black SoShi looks. At the end of the video, the girls are shown in the black room, after which the video ends similar to a TV shutting off.

Story Version
The story version is similar to the original version, with the two rooms where the girls are dancing, and there individual close-ups in their Black SoShi looks, but the overall video is different, with a tie-in with the video of the group's song "Oh!". In the beginning of the video, it shows the mishandled helmet spill a cup, which damages a computer monitor, causing the Black SoShi to emerge from the monitor and into the girls' room and begin making a mess of it. Soon, the girls meet the Black SoShi, and after an encounter with them, Yuri pulls the plug from the monitor to its outlet, turning off the monitor and causing the Black SoShi to disappear. When the girls are cleaning up the room, one of them touches the monitor, and it shows the Black SoShi.

Japanese version videos
On April 8, 2011, the teaser video for a Japanese version of "Run Devil Run" was released and the full video the following day. On April 25, 2011, a dance version was released.  Lisette Bustamante provided choreography for the videos.

The video is similar to the Korean version, except for altered dance moves and outfits. The music video begins with a blue room, after, it was changed to white, with the members dancing, in white outfits, like the Korean version, Then, changes the scenes, to a blue room what shows the girls dancing in blue outfits, the girls can be shown wearing different "Black SoShi" outfits. The first of two settings used in the music video is a white room with the members in white outfits. At the first chorus, glimpses of the second setting, a dark room with the members in fitting outfits, are shown. During the second chorus full scenes in this setting are shown.

Credits and personnel
Credits are adapted from Run Devil Run liner notes. The Japanese version credits are adapted from "Mr. Taxi / Run Devil Run" liner notes.

 Girls' Generation – Vocals
 Taeyeon – Main vocals, Background vocals
 Jessica – Main vocals, Background vocals
 Sunny – Vocals, Background vocals, Main Raps
 Tiffany – Lead vocals, Background vocals
 Hyoyeon – Vocals, Main Raps
 Yuri – Lead Vocals
 Sooyoung – Vocals, Raps
 Yoona – Vocals
 Seohyun – Main vocals, Background vocals
 Hong Ji-yoo – Lyrics 
 Kanata Nakamura – Lyrics 
 Kenzie – vocal direction
 Lee Seong Ho – recording engineer

 Nam Gung Jin – audio mixing
 Michael Busbee – songwriting
 Alex James – songwriting
 Kalle Engström – songwriting

Charts

Korean version

Year-end chart

Japanese version

Certifications and sales

Awards and nominations

Release history

Footnotes 
 Notes

 References

External links
 
 

Girls' Generation songs
2010 singles
2011 singles
Korean-language songs
Japanese-language songs
Songs with feminist themes
SM Entertainment singles
Songs written by Alex James (songwriter)
Songs written by busbee
Songs written by Kalle Engström
Gaon Digital Chart number-one singles
2010 songs